Samuel Joseph Hughes (born 15 April 1997) is an English footballer who plays as a defender for League One club Burton Albion.

Career
Hughes is a product of the Chester academy. He joined Leicester City in July 2017, playing for the side's Development Squad. He joined Salford City on loan in September 2019 and made his league debut on 7 September 2019.

On 9 October 2020, Hughes signed for EFL League One club Burton Albion on loan until January. He made his full debut the following day in a 2–0 defeat to Plymouth Argyle. He scored his first goal for Burton in a 4–2 win against Charlton Athletic on 24 November 2020.

Hughes signed permanently for Burton on a two and a half year deal in January 2022.

Career statistics

References

External links

1997 births
Living people
People from West Kirby
English footballers
Association football defenders
Chester F.C. players
Leicester City F.C. players
Salford City F.C. players
Burton Albion F.C. players
English Football League players
Sportspeople from Wirral
Footballers from Merseyside